The 1980 King Cup was the 22nd season of the knockout competition since its establishment in 1956. Al-Ahli were the defending champions but were eliminated by Ohod in the Round of 32. Al-Hilal defeated city rivals Al-Shabab to win their 3rd title and first since 1964.

Round of 32
The matches of the Round of 32 were held on 12, 13 and 14 April 1980.

Round of 16
The Round of 16 matches were held on 17 and 18 April 1980.

Quarter-finals
The Quarter-final matches were held on 21 and 22 April 1980.

Semi-finals
The four winners of the quarter-finals progressed to the semi-finals. The semi-finals were played on 24 and 25 April 1980. All times are local, AST (UTC+3).

Final
The final was played between Al-Hilal and Al-Shabab in the Youth Welfare Stadium in Riyadh. This was the second final to be played by two teams from the same city following the 1979 final. Al-Hilal were appearing in their 6th final while Al-Shabab were appearing in their 2nd final.

References

1980
Saudi Arabia
Cup